Paul "Pappy" Rowe (January 25, 1917 – August 28, 1990) was a Canadian professional football fullback.

Born in Victoria, British Columbia, he played for the Calgary Bronks (1938–1940) and Calgary Stampeders (1945–1950). He was captain of the team when Calgary won the Grey Cup in 1948 and played in the finals in 1949. In 1948, he was awarded the Dave Dryburgh Memorial Trophy.

He is a member of the Canadian Football Hall of Fame, BC Sports Hall of Fame, Alberta Sports Hall of Fame, Canada's Sports Hall of Fame, and Greater Victoria Sports Hall of Fame.

External links
 Alberta Sports Hall of Fame and Museum profile
 
 Canada's Sports Hall of Fame profile
 Greater Victoria Sports Hall of Fame profile

1917 births
1990 deaths
Canadian players of American football
Calgary Stampeders players
Players of Canadian football from British Columbia
Canadian Football Hall of Fame inductees
Canadian football fullbacks
Oregon Ducks football players
Sportspeople from Victoria, British Columbia